Sergio Rodríguez (born 1986) is a Spanish basketball player.

Sergio Rodríguez may also refer to:

 Sergio Rodríguez (footballer, born 1928), Uruguayan footballer
 Sergio Rodríguez (footballer, born 1978), Spanish footballer
 Sergio Rodríguez (footballer, born January 1985), Uruguayan footballer
 Sergio Rodríguez (footballer, born August 1985), Mexican footballer
 Sergio Rodríguez (footballer, born 1989), Spanish footballer
 Sergio Rodríguez (footballer, born 1992), Spanish footballer
 Sergio Rodríguez (footballer, born May 1995), Mexican footballer
 Sergio Rodríguez (footballer, born November 1995), Mexican footballer
 Sergio Rodríguez (cyclist) (born 1995), Spanish cyclist

See also
 Rodri (footballer, born 1984), Spanish footballer born Sergio Rodríguez García